Mian Muhammad Hamza Shahbaz (Urdu,; born 6 September 1974) is a Pakistani politician, who was the Leader of the Opposition in the Provincial Assembly of Punjab, in office since 20 October 2022. He also served in this position from September 2018 to April 2022. He was also the Chief Minister of Punjab from 30 April 2022 to 26 July 2022 (a Trustee from 22 July). He had been a member of the Provincial Assembly of Punjab from August 2018 till January 2023. Previously, he was a member of the National Assembly of Pakistan from June 2008 to May 2018. He is the eldest son of current Prime Minister Shehbaz Sharif.

Early and personal life
Hamza was born on 6 September 1974 to Shehbaz Sharif. He is a businessman by profession and is known as 'Poultry King of Punjab'. He ran the family business when his family was in exile.

He allegedly has three wives, one of whom is Ayesha Ahad Malik. Ayesha claimed she married Hamza in 2010. Hamza denied his marriage with Ayesha. He married Rabia Hamza in 2012.

In 2018, he declared his two wives' details in his nomination papers, Mehrunissah Hamza and Rabia Hamza.

Political career
Hamza participated in politics from early age and was imprisoned in Adiala Jail during his college life in 1994 along with other Pakistan Muslim League leaders. He began his political career in October 1999 when Pervez Musharraf sent his father Shahbaz Sharif and uncle Nawaz Sharif into exile following the 1999 Pakistani coup d'état. Hamza was allowed to remain in Pakistan to look after family businesses. In 2011, it was reported that the PML-N was considering promoting Hamza as the general-secretary of the Punjab chapter.

He ran for the seat of Provincial Assembly of the Punjab as an independent candidate from Constituency PP-142 (Lahore-VI) in 2008 Pakistani general election, but was unsuccessful. He received 111 votes and lost the seat to Khawaja Salman Rafique.

He was elected unopposed to the National Assembly of Pakistan as a candidate of Pakistan Muslim League (N) (PML-N) from Constituency NA-119 (Lahore-II) in by-elections held in June 2008.

Hamza was re-elected to the National Assembly as a candidate of PML-N from Constituency NA-119 (Lahore-II) in 2013 Pakistani general election. In 2016, Dawn called Hamza as informal deputy prime minister of Pakistan and deputy chief minister of Punjab.

He was re-elected to the National Assembly as a candidate of PML-N from Constituency NA-124 (Lahore-II) in 2018 Pakistani general election. In the same election, he was elected to the Provincial Assembly of the Punjab as a candidate of PML-N from Constituency PP-146 (Lahore-III). Following his successful election, he abandoned his national assembly seat in favor of the provincial assembly seat. On 13 August 2018, PML-N nominated him for the office of Chief Minister of Punjab. On 19 August 2018, he received 159 votes and lost the office to Sardar Usman Buzdar who secured 186 votes.

On 25 August 2018, PML-N nominated Hamza for the office of the opposition leader in Punjab Assembly. On 6 September 2018, he was appointed as Leader of the Opposition in the Punjab Assembly. Hamza Shehbaz ran for Chief Minister of the Provincial Assembly of the Punjab and was elected on 16 April 2022 after getting 197 votes against his opponent Chaudhry Pervaiz Elahi.

He is also serving as the Vice President of Pakistan Muslim League Nawaz (PMLN) since May 2019 of which his father Mian Shahbaz Sharif is the President.

Chief Ministership 
The Hamza Shahbaz Chief Ministry was formed on 30 April 2022, after Hamza was nominated as candidate for Chief Minister of Punjab by opposition parties after the resignation of Usman Buzdar. He took oath as the legally invalid 19th Chief Minister of Punjab on 30 April 2022. He had the majority of 11 seats in the ruling alliance that was formed of three political parties and 4 independent candidates. However, in light of the orders given by the Supreme Court of Pakistan, Hamza Shehbaz was to be considered as never having been Chief Minister and his election to be invalid as well as all his orders given during his invalid tenure. He was succeeded by Chaudhry Pervaiz Elahi as the officially proclaimed 19th Chief Minister of Punjab, due to gained majority of votes in the election in the Provincial Assembly for electing the Chief Minister, and the successive Supreme Court ruling.

Assets 
In 2014, Dawn reported that Hamza Shahbaz Sharif is wealthier than his father, Shahbaz Sharif, with net assets of Rs 250.46m. A report noted Hamza's assets increased from Rs 583,191 declared in 2008 to Rs 211,080,295 in 2011.

As of 2018, Hamza's declared asset worth was Rs 411 million.

Corruption allegations 
He was arrested on 11 June 2019 by the National Accountability Bureau over corruption charges. The arrest was made based on alleged money laundering and holding assets beyond means.

In another scandal Federal Investigation Agency revealed 28 benami accounts through which reportedly money laundering of Rs. 16.3 bn was made through seventeen thousand credit transactions. FIA claimed that
Eleven low-paid employees of the Sharif group were used to execute these transactions. Hamza Shahbaz and his father Shehbaz Sharif were to be indicted on February 10, 2022. However, the indictment was delayed on 18, February 2022 by  Special Central Court of Lahore.

In the sugar scandal case Federal Investigation Agency alleged that money laundering of Rs. 25 bn was done using employees of Ramzan (RSML) and AI-Arabia Sugar Mills (ASML) using fake accounts. However, Hamza Shabaz denied these claims and termed it as business transaction. 
 Hamza was given pre-arrest bail on sugar scam on January 28, 2022. 
Hamza Shehbaz got pre-arrest bail in money laundering, and sugar scams in January 2022, and was subsequently granted bail on 24 February 2021 by Lahore High Court over an asset beyond known means case.

References 

Living people
1974 births
Pakistani MNAs 2008–2013
Pakistani MNAs 2013–2018
Pakistani people of Kashmiri descent
Pakistan Muslim League (N) MNAs
Politicians from Lahore
Hamza
Pakistani prisoners and detainees
Pakistan Muslim League (N) MPAs (Punjab)
Punjabi people
Leaders of the Opposition in the Provincial Assembly of the Punjab
Punjab MPAs 2018–2023